Erich Cviertna (16 March 1951 – 5 October 2013) was a Czech football player and manager.

As a footballer, Cviertna played for several lower league clubs. As a manager, Cviertna coached several Czech clubs, most notable of them being Gambrinus liga clubs SK Sigma Olomouc and FC Baník Ostrava. He was sacked as a manager of Baník Ostrava on 2 May 2003 for bad results of the team. Cviertna had however bad relations with the club's chairmen and was reportedly sacked for repeatedly criticizing them. Cviertna joined FK Fotbal Třinec as manager in November 2008 but didn't stay past 2009.

References

1951 births
2013 deaths
Sportspeople from Nový Jičín
Czechoslovak footballers
Czechoslovak football managers
Czech football managers
Czech First League managers
SK Sigma Olomouc managers
FC Baník Ostrava managers
FK Fotbal Třinec managers
FK Vítkovice managers

Association football defenders
Czech National Football League managers